The Great Deceiver or Artificial Sons (Spanish: El gran mentiroso) is a 1953 Mexican comedy film directed by and starring Fernando Soler. It is based on a play which has been adapted into films several times including the 1943 Argentine production Artificial Sons.

Cast
 Fernando Soler as Rafael  
 Anita Blanch as Rafaela  
 Andrés Soler as Don Dabino  
 Irma Torres as Angelita  
 Joaquín Cordero as Fernando Palmerin  
 Emma Roldán as Catalina  
 Aurora Walker as Mama de Fernando  
 Alfonso Torres 
 Rosa P. Mosquera 
 Jorge Vidal 
 Blanca Marroquín 
 María Herrero as La coralito  
 José Chávez

References

Locations 
 Heroica Zitácuaro, Michoacán
 San José Purúa spa in Jungapeo, Michoacán

Bibliography 
 María Luisa Amador. Cartelera cinematográfica, 1950-1959. UNAM, 1985.

External links 
 

1953 films
1953 comedy films
Mexican comedy films
1950s Spanish-language films
Mexican black-and-white films
1950s Mexican films